The 1994 Oran Park ATCC round was the tenth and final round of the 1994 Australian Touring Car Championship. It was held on the weekend of 22 to 24 July at Oran Park Raceway in Sydney, New South Wales.

Race results

Qualifying

Race 1 
As Glenn Seton leapt off the line, chaos ensued behind. Skaife, Longhurst and Garnder tangled down the pack, which sent Skaife and Longhurst off into the infield. In a bizarre incident, Kevin Waldock's rear right wheel caught fire and detached from the vehicle. Brock passed Bowe for second and pressured Seton all the way to line, although this would prove to be not enough. Seton would win, with Brock in second and Johnson in third.

Race 2 
For the final race of the year, Brock and Seton were dead even off the line, with Seton's track position allowing for him to obtain the lead by the first corner. Dick Johnson spun Wayne Gardner on the final corner after attempting a move for position. Skaife's horror weekend continued as he spun coming out of the bridge, falling down the pack. Up the front, Glenn Seton would make it two wins from two, with Peter Brock in second and Alan Jones in third.

Championship Standings 

Drivers' Championship standings

References

External links 

Oran Park